In Greek mythology, Menippus (Ancient Greek: Μένιππον) was an Achaean warrior who participated in the Trojan War. He sailed from Phylace and followed Protesilaus to the war at Troy. Menippus met his demise at the hands of the Amazon Clonie.

Note

References 

 Quintus Smyrnaeus, The Fall of Troy translated by Way. A. S. Loeb Classical Library Volume 19. London: William Heinemann, 1913. Online version at theio.com
 Quintus Smyrnaeus, The Fall of Troy. Arthur S. Way. London: William Heinemann; New York: G.P. Putnam's Sons. 1913. Greek text available at the Perseus Digital Library.

Achaeans (Homer)